A victim of fanaticism is a painting by Mykola Pymonenko, painted in 1899.

Background 
Pymonenko had read a newspaper account of an attack by members of the Jewish community on a girl who fell in love with a Ukrainian blacksmith and decided to convert to Christianity in order to marry him. Pymonenko visited the town of Kremenets in Volhynia, where he made many sketches from nature.

Subject 
A young girl in a torn shirt, fleeing from an angry mob, clings to a fence, a cross is visible on her neck. Directly opposite her stands a man shaking his fists, wearing Jewish ritual clothes - in addition to the kippah, he wears a tefillin and a tallit. The rest of the inhabitants of the town are dressed casually. Many of them are armed with sticks, umbrellas and tongs. The girl's parents are somewhat aloof: the mother is crying, turning away from her daughter, and the father has his right hand raised as a sign of renunciation of his daughter.

Technical details 
The painting is oil on canvas. It is currently on display at the Kharkiv Art Museum.

References 

Ukrainian paintings
1899 paintings